In mathematics, a telescoping series is a series whose general term  can be written as , i.e. the difference of two consecutive terms of a sequence .

As a consequence the partial sums only consists of two terms of  after cancellation. The cancellation technique, with part of each term cancelling with part of the next term, is known as the method of differences.

For example, the series

(the series of reciprocals of pronic numbers) simplifies as 

An early statement of the formula for the sum or partial sums of a telescoping series can be found in a 1644 work by Evangelista Torricelli, De dimensione parabolae.

In general

Telescoping sums are finite sums in which pairs of consecutive terms cancel each other, leaving only the initial and final terms.

Let  be a sequence of numbers. Then, 

If 

Telescoping products are finite products in which consecutive terms cancel denominator with numerator, leaving only the initial and final terms.

Let  be a sequence of numbers. Then, 

If

More examples

 Many trigonometric functions also admit representation as a difference, which allows telescopic canceling between the consecutive terms. 
 Some sums of the form  where f and g are polynomial functions whose quotient may be broken up into partial fractions, will fail to admit summation by this method.  In particular, one has  The problem is that the terms do not cancel.
 Let k be a positive integer.  Then  where Hk is the kth harmonic number.  All of the terms after  cancel.
 Let k,m with k  m be positive integers.  Then

An application in probability theory 

In probability theory, a Poisson process is a stochastic process of which the simplest case involves "occurrences" at random times, the waiting time until the next occurrence having a memoryless exponential distribution, and the number of "occurrences" in any time interval having a Poisson distribution whose expected value is proportional to the length of the time interval.  Let Xt be the number of "occurrences" before time t, and let Tx be the waiting time until the xth "occurrence".  We seek the probability density function of the random variable Tx.  We use the probability mass function for the Poisson distribution, which tells us that

 

where λ is the average number of occurrences in any time interval of length 1.  Observe that the event {Xt ≥ x} is the same as the event {Tx ≤ t}, and thus they have the same probability. Intuitively, if something occurs at least  times before time , we have to wait at most  for the  occurrence.  The density function we seek is therefore

 

The sum telescopes, leaving

Similar concepts

Telescoping product
A telescoping product is a finite product (or the partial product of an infinite product) that can be cancelled by method of quotients to be eventually only a finite number of factors.

For example, the infinite product

simplifies as

Other applications 

For other applications, see:

 Grandi's series;
 Proof that the sum of the reciprocals of the primes diverges, where one of the proofs uses a telescoping sum;
 Fundamental theorem of calculus, a continuous analog of telescoping series;
 Order statistic, where a telescoping sum occurs in the derivation of a probability density function;
 Lefschetz fixed-point theorem, where a telescoping sum arises in algebraic topology;
 Homology theory, again in algebraic topology;
 Eilenberg–Mazur swindle, where a telescoping sum of knots occurs;
 Faddeev–LeVerrier algorithm.

References 

Mathematical series